Gordon Vincent Green (28 February 1890 – 30 May 1973) was an Australian rules footballer who played in the Victorian Football League (VFL).

Green made his debut for the Carlton Football Club in round 5 of the 1911 season. He last played in the 1921 Grand Final between Carlton and Richmond before retiring.

Green coached St. James Football Club in 1928.

External links
 Gordon Green at Blueseum

References

Carlton Football Club players
Carlton Football Club Premiership players
Yarrawonga Football Club players
Australian rules footballers from Victoria (Australia)
1890 births
1973 deaths
Two-time VFL/AFL Premiership players